Shingo Nishimura (July 7, 1948 - ) is a Japanese politician, former member of House of Representatives, Japan.

Background and career
A native of Sakai, Osaka and graduate of Kyoto University Faculty of Law, Nishimura was elected to the Diet for the first time in 1993 after an unsuccessful run in 1992.

On 2005, Because of Lawyer act of Japan violation, Nishimura is divested his lawyer license.

Three other members of his family have also been members of the House of Representatives: 
his father Eiichi Nishimura (1904-1971) was a former chairman of the Democratic Socialist Party - Shingo is his fourth son
his father-in-law Okazawa Kanji
his cousin Shozo Nishimura

Right-wing positions
Affiliated to the openly revisionist lobby Nippon Kaigi, Nishimura was a supporter of right-wing filmmaker Satoru Mizushima's 2007 revisionist film The Truth about Nanjing, which denied that the Nanking Massacre ever occurred.

Nishimura was among the members of the Nippon Kaigi council at the Diet who signed a full-page advertisement in the Washington Post following the US House Resolution on 'Comfort women'. The ad denied Imperial Japan's sexual slavery system: "We must note that it is a gross and deliberate distortion of reality to contend that the Japanese army was guilty of 'coercing young women intro sexual slavery' in 'one of the largest cases of human trafficking in the 20th century'".

In a statement defending the mayor of Osaka, Toru Hashimoto in May, 2013, Shingo Nishimura made the controversial claim that Japan is full of Korean prostitutes, a comment that got him removed from Toru Hashimoto's party.

In Results of the Japanese general election, 2014, Nishimura was defeated.

References

External links 
 Official website 

Living people
1948 births
People from Sakai, Osaka
Kyoto University alumni
20th-century Japanese lawyers
Members of the House of Representatives (Japan)
Democratic Party of Japan politicians
Democratic Socialist Party (Japan) politicians
Party for Japanese Kokoro politicians
Japanese anti-communists
Members of Nippon Kaigi
Nanjing Massacre deniers
21st-century Japanese politicians